Carl John "Swede" Peterson (March 26, 1897 – July 1, 1964) was an American football player and coach. He played college football for Nebraska and professionally for one season in the National Football League (NFL) as a center for the Kansas City Blues in 1924. He was selected as a third-team center on the 1924 All-Pro Team.

Peterson later served for three seasons as the head coach of the Augustana (Illinois) Vikings football team.

Head coaching record

Football

References

1897 births
1964 deaths
American football centers
Augustana (Illinois) Vikings baseball coaches
Augustana (Illinois) Vikings football coaches
Kansas City Blues (NFL) players
Nebraska Cornhuskers football players
Sportspeople from Salt Lake City
Players of American football from Salt Lake City